Ivaylo Georgiev (born 31 October 1942) is a former Bulgarian footballer who played as a midfielder. He competed at the 1968 Summer Olympics in Mexico City, where he won a silver medal with the Bulgarian national team.

References

External links

1942 births
Living people
Bulgarian footballers
Bulgaria international footballers
Akademik Sofia players
FC Lokomotiv 1929 Sofia players
PFC Slavia Sofia players
First Professional Football League (Bulgaria) players
Association football midfielders
Olympic footballers of Bulgaria
Medalists at the 1968 Summer Olympics
Footballers at the 1968 Summer Olympics
Olympic silver medalists for Bulgaria
Olympic medalists in football
People from Montana, Bulgaria